Mary Marquet (born Micheline Marguerite Delphine Marquet; 14 April 1895 – 29 August 1979) was a French stage and film actress.

Career
Marquet came from a family of artists: her parents were actors, an aunt was a star dancer  at the Paris Opera, and another was an official at the Comédie-Française. She entered the National Superior Conservatory of Dramatic Art in 1913 and studied under Paul Mounet. She failed her final exams, but was immediately engaged in the company of Sarah Bernhardt, who was a great friend of the family. She went on play alongside her in The Eugene Morand cathedral.

She became established with her role in L'Aiglon by Edmond Rostand, whose mistress she became from 1915 to his death in 1918. She made her film debut in 1914 in a silent film,  Les Frères ennemis, which was never finished. Her first major film role was in Sappho, produced by Léonce Perret in 1932. After World War I, she joined the Comédie-Française in 1923 where she stayed for over twenty years, before moving to the boulevard Theatre.

During the World War II, throughout the occupation, she sought the protection of German officers to protect her son who had told her of his intention to join the Resistance. The response was his arrest and deportation to Buchenwald concentration camp where he died aged 21. This was possibly the cause of her problems at the time of the Liberation when, due to her alleged relations with the enemy, Marquet was arrested and sent to Drancy and then to Fresnes. She was later released for lack of evidence.

In the 1950s, she turned to poetry recital, while continuing her career in theater on the boulevards. She worked for ORTF in the Maigret episodes of  Les Cinq Dernières Minutes and Les Saintes Chéries and in the television adaptation of Lucien Leuwen, the novel by Stendhal.

Parallel to her acting career, as an antiquarian she ran a stand for many years at the Swiss Village, an important antique market in Paris where she demonstrated her skills as a saleswoman, mixing theatrical memorabilia with commercial interests.

Among her most successful parts in over forty films, were her roles in, Landru in 1962, Claude Chabrol, La Grande Vadrouille in 1966 by Gérard Oury, and Casanova in 1975 by Federico Fellini.  After these three minor parts she played important roles in La vie de château  (1966) the mother of Philippe Noiret and the stepmother of Catherine Deneuve and the Le malin plaisir (1975) with Claude Jade and Anny Duperey.

Personal life

Her first lover was Edmond Rostand around 1915, living together for three years. In 1920 she married Maurice Escande, the future director of the house of Molière, ending in divorce in 1921, before meeting Firmin Gémier, the director of the new Théâtre National Populaire, who was still married but whose wife was barren. In 1922, Marquet gave birth to their son.

Before the death of Gémier in 1933, Marquet became the mistress of the president of the then Council, André Tardieu, in a semi-official liaison. Having broken up with Tardieu, she married Victor Francen. The couple separated after seven years together. Marquet died of heart attack at the age of 84 in her apartment in the Rue Carpeaux, She is buried in Montmartre Cemetery.

Filmography

Cinema 

1913: Frères ennemis (Short, by Henri Pouctal)
1913: De medeminaars (by Alfred Machin, unsure))
1915: Sacrifice fraternel (Short, by René Leprince)
1917: La P'tite du sixième (by René Hervil et Louis Mercanton)
1921:  (by Jean Kemm) - L'intrigante Aleth Guépie
1924: The Clairvoyant (by Leon Abrams) - Madame Detaille
1934: Sapho (by Léonce Perret) - Fanny Legrand
1934:  (Short, by Léonce Perret)
1949: Forbidden to the Public (by Alfred Pasquali) - Gabrielle Tristan
1950:  (by Léo Joannon) - Madame de la Chambrière
1952:  (by Jean-René Legrand) - Estelle de Marsans
1952:  (by Jean Loubignac) - Madame Barbentin mère 
1952:  (by Léo Joannon) - Madame Aglaé
1952:  (by Jean Loubignac)
1953: Open Letter (by Alex Joffé) - Laurence - La belle-mère
1953:  (by Christian Stengel) - La grand-mère
1954: Royal Affairs in Versailles (by Sacha Guitry) - Madame de Maintenon
1955: Men in White (by Ralph Habib) - Mme. Ledragon
1956: Maid in Paris (by Pierre Gaspard-Huit) - Mme. Bernemal
1956:  (by Léo Joannon) - La supérieure de Marseille
1956: Law of the Streets (by Ralph Habib) - Madame Blain
1957: Quelle sacrée soirée / Nuit blanche et rouge à lèvres (by Robert Vernay) - La colonelle Dupont
1959: Drôle de phénomènes (by Robert Vernay) - La grand-mère volante
1960: The Nabob Affair (by Ralph Habib) - L'hôtelière
1962:  (by Édouard Molinaro) - la reine-mère Elisabeth de Moldavie / Queen Mother
1962: Nous irons à Deauville (by Francis Rigaud) - La propriétaire - Gertrude Couffinous
1963: Landru (by Claude Chabrol) - Madame Guillin
1966: A Matter of Resistance (by Jean-Paul Rappeneau) - Charlotte
1966:  (by Jean-Claude Roy) - Mme Florenne, la marieuse
1966: The Gardener of Argenteuil (by Jean-Paul Le Chanois) - Dora
1966: La Grande Vadrouille (by Gérard Oury) - Mère Supérieure
1967: Des garçons et des filles (by Étienne Périer) - Tante Berthe
1967:  (by Jacques Poitrenaud) - La Duchesse
1968:  (by Pierre Jourdan) - Oenone
1969:  (by ) - Le mère de Michel
1974: Le Mouton enragé (by Michel Deville)
1974:  (Short, by André Weinfeld) - La tante / The Aunt
1974:  (by ) - La propriètaire
1974: Le polygame (by Maurice Jacquin Jr.) - La concierge
1974:  (by Marcel Carné) - La duchesse
1975: Malicious Pleasure (by Bernard Toublanc-Michel) - Madame Malaiseau
1976:  (by Robert Lamoureux) - La centenaire
1976: Fellini's Casanova (by Federico Fellini) - Casanova's mother (uncredited)
1977:  (by Michel Lang) - La grand-mère (final film role)

Television 
1968:  (episode Ève et les grands-parents (Daniel Gélin's mother and Henri Crémieux's wife)) - La mère de Pierre
1972:  (by François Villiers, episode: Maigret se fâche) - Mme Bernadette Armorelle
1973-1974: Lucien Leuwen (mini-serie) (by Claude Autant-Lara, TV Movie) - Mme de Marcilly
1974:  (by Pierre Gaspard-Huit) - Tante Vauté (1974)

Theatre

Before time at the Comédie-Française 
 1912: Faust by Johann Wolfgang von Goethe, théâtre de l'Odéon
 1920]: L'Homme à la rose by Henry Bataille, mise-en-scène André Brulé, théâtre de Paris  
 1921: Le Caducée by André Pascal, Théâtre de la Renaissance, théâtre du Gymnase
 1921: La Bataille by Pierre Frondaie d'après Claude Farrère, mise-en-scène Firmin Gémier, théâtre Antoine
 1922: L'Insoumise by Pierre Frondaie, théâtre Antoine

During time at the Comédie-Française 
 Admission at the Comédie-Française in 1923
 Sociétaire from 1928 to 1945
 376th sociétaire
 1923: Oreste by René Berton from Iphigenia in Tauris by Euripides, Comédie-Française
 1923: Jean de La Fontaine ou Le Distrait volontaire by Louis Geandreau et Léon Guillot de Saix, Comédie-Française 
 1924: Les Trois Sultanes by Charles-Simon Favart, Comédie-Française
 1924: La Victoire de Ronsard by René Berton, Comédie-Française 
 1924: L'Adieu by Louis Vaunois, Comédie-Française
 1924: La Reprise by Maurice Donnay, Comédie-Française   
 1925: Esther by Racine, Comédie-Française   
 1927: La Torche sous le boisseau by Gabriele D'Annunzio, Comédie-Française 
 1930:  by Prosper Mérimée, mise-en-scène Émile Fabre, Comédie-Française  
 1932: Christine by Paul Géraldy, Comédie-Française 
 1934: Andromaque by Racine, mise-en-scène , Comédie-Française – Andromaque
 1935: Madame Quinze de Jean Sarment, mise-en-scène de l'auteur, Comédie-Française  
 1935: Lucrèce Borgia by Victor Hugo, mise-en-scène Émile Fabre, Comédie-Française – Lucrèce Borgia
 1936: Hedda Gabler by Henrik Ibsen, mise-en-scène Lugné-Poe, Comédie-Française – Hedda Gabler
 1936: La Rabouilleuse by Émile Fabre after Honoré de Balzac, mise-en-scène Émile Fabre, Comédie-Française – Flore Brazier
 1938: Hedda Gabler by Henrik Ibsen, mise-en-scène Lugné-Poe, Comédie-Française – Hedda Gabler
 1938: Tricolore by Pierre Lestringuez, mise-en-scène Louis Jouvet, Comédie-Française     
 1939: Athalie by Jean Racine, Comédie-Française – Athalie
 1941: Lucrezia Borgia by Victor Hugo, mise-en-scène Émile Fabre, Comédie-Française – Lucrèce Borgia  
 1942: Iphigénie en Tauride by Goethe, mise-en-scène Jean Yonnel, Comédie-Française – Iphigénie 
 1942: Phèdre by Racine, mise-en-scène Jean-Louis Barrault, Comédie-Française 
 1943: Renaud et Armide by Jean Cocteau, mise-en-scène by the author, Comédie-Française
 1943: Iphigénie à Delphes by Gerhart Hauptmann, mise-en-scène Pierre Bertin, Comédie-Française – Iphigénie 
 1943: The Satin Slipper by Paul Claudel, mise-en-scène Jean-Louis Barrault, Comédie-Française
 1944: Horace by Corneille, mise-en-scène Mary Marquet, Comédie-Française

After time at the Comédie-Française 
 1945: Les Dames de Niskala by Hella Wuolijoki, Théâtre Édouard VII 
 1948:  by Roger Dornès and Jean Marsan, mise en scène Alfred Pasquali, Comédie-Wagram
 1950: La Grande Pauline et les Petits Chinois by René Aubert, mise-en-scène Pierre Valde, Théâtre de l'Étoile   
 1951: Mort d'un rat by Jan de Hartog, mise en scène , Théâtre Gramont
 1951:  by Robert de Flers and Francis de Croisset, mise-en-scène Pierre Dux, Théâtre de Paris
 1953: Le Ravageur by Gabriel Chevallier, mise-en-scène Alfred Pasquali, Théâtre des Bouffes-Parisiens
 1955: Les Trois messieurs de Bois-Guillaume by Louis Verneuil, mise-en-scène Christian-Gérard, avec Fernand Gravey, Théâtre des Variétés
 1957: The Castle by Franz Kafka, mise-en-scène Jean-Louis Barrault Théâtre Sarah Bernhardt
 1963: Pour Lucrèce de Jean Giraudoux, mise en scène Raymond Gérôme, Festival de Bellac
 1963: Sémiramis by Marc Camoletti, mise-en-scène Michel de Ré, Théâtre Édouard VII
 1966: Se trouver de Luigi Pirandello, mise-en-scène , Théâtre Antoine
 1969: Le Bon Saint-Éloi de Pierrette Bruno, mise en scène Jacques Mauclair,  
 1971:  de Gaby Bruyère, mise-en-scène Robert Manuel, with Alfred Pasquali, Théâtre des Nouveautés

Publications 
 Vous qui m'aimiez, vous que j'aimais
 Ce que j'ose dire
 Ce que je n'ai pas dit
 Tout n'est peut-être pas dit

References

Further reading

External links 
 

French stage actresses
French film actresses
French silent film actresses
20th-century French actresses
Sociétaires of the Comédie-Française
1895 births
1979 deaths
Burials at Montmartre Cemetery